El Kayal Mosque  is a Tunisian mosque in the north of the Medina of Tunis, in Bab Souika suburb.

Localization
The mosque can be found in 4 El Mehrzi Street.

Etymology
According to the historian Mohamed Belkhodja, the mosque got its name from the founder, a grains measurer called Kayal in Tunisian dialect.

References

Mosques in Tunis